This is a summary of the year 2021 in British music.

Events
 11 January – The London Symphony Orchestra (LSO) announces that Sir Simon Rattle is to stand down as its music director in 2023, and is scheduled subsequently to take the title of LSO conductor emeritus for life.
 21 January – The Glastonbury Festival announces the cancellation of its scheduled 2021 Festival, in the wake of the COVID-19 pandemic.
 22 January – The City of Birmingham Symphony Orchestra announces that Mirga Gražinytė-Tyla is to conclude her tenure as its music director after the 2021–2022 season, and subsequently to take on the post of principal guest conductor.
 27 January – PRS for Music institutes its new "Online Live Concert" licence fee, for ticketed small-scale live-streamed performances, at a scale of £22.50 plus VAT for events with revenue up to £250, regardless of whether the takings surpass £250, and a doubling of the fee for events that gross between £251 and £500.
 1 February – Following protests by musicians, PRS for Music announces an amendment to its new "Online Live Concert" licence fee scheme, whereby livestreamed events that produce less than £500 revenue are newly to be covered by a free licence, on the condition that artists exclusively perform their own works.
 5 February – The Schleswig-Holstein Musik Festival announces Isata Kanneh-Mason as the recipient of its Leonard Bernstein Award for 2021.
 18 February – The City of London Corporation announces the cancellation of plans for the intended Centre for Music, with scheduled renovations of the Barbican Centre to occur instead.
 1 March – The Download Festival announces cancellation of its 2021 festival season, in the wake of the COVID-19 pandemic.
 2 March – The Isle of Wight Festival announces the re-scheduling of its 2021 festival season from 17–20 June 2021 to 16–19 September 2021.
 9 March – Winston Marshall announces that he is taking indefinite leave of absence from Mumford & Sons, following criticism of his Tweet in praise of Andy Ngo's book Unmasked.
 12 March – The Association of British Orchestras announces its 2021 ABO Awards at its 2021 conference:
 ABO Award: The Musicians
 Classical Music Artist Manager of the Year: Moema Parrott
 Classical Music Concert Hall Manager of the Year: John Gilhooly
 Orchestra Manager of the Year: Crispin Woodhead
 Commendation: Greg Felton
 ABO Special Award: John Summers and Timothy Walker
 16 March – Royal Northern Sinfonia announces the appointment of Dinis Sousa as its next principal conductor, effective September 2021.
 18 March – The BBC announces that the leadership team of BBC Radio 3 is to relocate to Salford, along with relocation of select Radio 6 staff.
 30 March
 The London Symphony Orchestra announces the appointment of Sir Antonio Pappano as its next chief conductor, effective in September 2024.
 The Royal Opera announces that Sir Antonio Pappano is to conclude his tenure as ROH music director at the close of the 2023-2024 season.
 7 April – Southbank Sinfonia and St John's Smith Square mutually announce their merger into a single charity and organisation, Southbank Sinfonia at St John's Smith Square.
 8 April – The London Philharmonic Orchestra announces the appointment of Elena Dubinets as its next artistic director, effective September 2021, following the departure of Cristina Rocca from the post.
 13 April – English Touring Opera announces the appointment of Gerry Cornelius as its next music director, with immediate effect.
 30 April – At Bramley-Moore Dock, Liverpool, 3000 clubbers participate in an Events Research Programme test event headlined by DJ Jayda G, without social distancing or required mask-wearing, as part of a scientific study on coronavirus transmission at mass events.
 2 May
 The BBC announces percussionist Fang Zhang as the BBC Young Musician 2020.
 At Sefton Park, Liverpool, 5000 attendees attend a live concert with performances by Zuzu and by Blossoms, in an Events Research Programme test event, without social distancing or required mask-wearing, as part of a scientific study on coronavirus transmission at mass events, the largest such UK music gathering since the start of the COVID-19 pandemic.
 12 June - Queen's Birthday Honours List 2021:  
 Imogen Cooper is made a Dame Commander of the British Empire.
 Ram John Holder, Lulu, and Rick Wakeman are each made an Commander of the Order of the British Empire.
 Eleanor Alberga, Julian Lloyd Webber, Alan Parsons, Skin (Deborah Anne Dyer), John Summers, and Michael Volpe are each made an Officer of the Order of the British Empire.
 Jess Gillam, Dennis Bovell, Engelbert Humperdinck, Alison Moyet, Huw Watkins, and Sarah Willis are each made a Member of the Order of the British Empire.
 Alan Hawkshaw and Jeremy Huw Williams are each awarded the British Empire Medal.
 18 June – The Download Pilot Festival begins in Donington Park in Leicestershire, a 3-day pilot test event without mask or social distance requirements for attendees.
 24 June - Winston Marshall announces that he is leaving Mumford & Sons, following controversy over him praising right-wing journalist Andy Ngo.
 4 August – The BBC announces the appointment of Bill Chandler as the new Director of the BBC Concert Orchestra, effective 4 September 2021.
 10 August – The BBC announces the appointment of Suzy Klein as its new Head of Arts and Classical Music TV, effective 4 October 2021.
 14 August - Simon Gallup announces that he has left The Cure, citing "betrayal" as his reasons for leaving.  Gallup soon deleted his post, and confirmed on 14 October that he was still in the band.
 17 August - Alan Leach and Joe Johnson announce that they will be leaving Shed Seven after fulfilling their touring commitments with the band in the Summer.
 23 August - John Lydon loses a legal case, to prevent former Sex Pistols bandmates Steve Jones and Paul Cook from allowing the use of their songs in a television biopic based on the band.
 5 September – The Sinfonia of London, in its newest incarnation, performs its first live concert at the Royal Albert Hall as part of the 2021 season of The Proms, conducted by John Wilson.
 14 September – The City of Birmingham Symphony Orchestra announces the appointment of Kazuki Yamada as its next chief conductor and artistic advisor, the first Asian conductor ever named to the posts, effective 1 April 2023, with an initial contract of 4.5 years.
 18 September – The 2021 Leeds International Piano Competition announces its prize winners:
 First prize: Alim Beisembayev
 Second prize: Kaito Kabayashi
 Third prize: Ariel Lanyi
 Fourth prize: Dmytro Choni
 Fifth prize: Thomas Kelly
 15 October – The Choir of St John's College, Cambridge announces its intention to admit female singers to the choir for the first time in its history, effective in 2022.
 17 October – The London Handel Festival announces the appointment of Gregory Batsleer as its next festival director, with immediate effect.
 25 October – The London Mozart Players announce the appointment of Flynn LeBrocq as its new chief executive, effective January 2022.
 1 November – The Royal Philharmonic Society announces the recipients of the 2021 Royal Philharmonic Society Awards:
 Chamber-Scale Composition: Laura Bowler – Wicked Problems
 Conductor: Ryan Bancroft
 Ensemble: Dunedin Consort
 Gamechanger: Bold Tendencies
 Impact: ENO Breathe
 Inspiration: Hilary Campbell and Bristol Choral Society
 Instrumentalist: Nicola Benedetti
 Large-Scale Composition: Dani Howard - Trombone Concerto
 Opera & Music Theatre: L'enfant et les sortilèges - Vopera
 Series & Events: 'The World How Wide' - Chorus of Royal Northern Sinfonia
 Singer: Jennifer Johnston
 Storytelling: Kadiatu Kanneh-Mason - House of Music 
 Young Artist: The Hermes Experiment
 18 November – Sir Roger Norrington conducts his self-proclaimed final classical concert, with the Royal Northern Sinfonia at The Sage, Gateshead.
 4 December – The Schleswig-Holstein Musik Festival announces Hannah Kendall as the recipient of its Hindemith Prize 2022.
 8 December – The Ivors Composer Awards announces its 2021 recipients:
 Impact Award – Zoe Rahman
 Visionary Award – Sarah Angliss
 Innovation Award – Cleveland Watkiss
 Jazz Composition – Nikki Iles: The Caged Bird
 Large-Scale Composition – Anna Þorvaldsdóttir: Catamorphosis
 Outstanding Works Collection – Alexander Goehr
 Small Chamber Composition – Alex Paxton: Sometimes Voices
 Solo Composition – Martin Iddon: Lampades
 Sound Art – Caroline Kraabel: London 26 And 28 March 2020: Imitation: Inversion
 Vocal and Choral Composition – Thomas Adès: Gyökér (Root)
 31 December – 2022 New Year Honours:
 John Gilhooly is made a Commander of the Order of the British Empire.
 Alpesh Chauhan, Steven Osborne, and Mark Pemberton are each made an Officer of the Order of the British Empire.
 Michael Asante, Peter Broadbent, Andrew Carwood, Sydney Harris, and Berendina Norton are each made a Member of the Order of the British Empire.
 Nikki Iles and Mark Strachan are each awarded the British Empire Medal.

Bands formed
 Flo

Bands reformed
 Altered Images
 The Boo Radleys
 Electrasy
 Faces
 Hundred Reasons
 The Wanted

Television programmes

Classical works
 Hannah Kendall – 'Where is the chariot of fire?'
 Jack Sheen – Hollow propranolol séance
 Thomas Adès
 Shanty – Over the Sea
 Alchymia (clarinet quintet)
 Errollyn Wallen – Sojourner Truth
 Natalie Klouda – Nightscapes 2020
 Mark Simpson – Violin Concerto
 Simon Holt – Cloud Shadow
 Colin Matthews – Seascapes (texts by Sidney Keyes)
 Mark-Anthony Turnage
 Owl Songs
 Up for Grabs
 Charlotte Bray – When Icebergs Dance Away
 Hannah Kendall (music) and Sabrina Mahfouz (text) – Rosalind
 Sir John Tavener – La Noche Oscura (completed in 2012, premiered 25 June 2021)
 Sir James MacMillan – When Soft Voices Die
 Daniel Kidane - Revel
 Sir George Benjamin – Concerto for Orchestra
 Bryn Harrison - A Coiled Form
 Jonathan Dove – In Exile
 Grace-Evangeline Mason – The Imagined Forest
 Kate Whitley (music) and Laura Attridge (text) – Our Future in Your Hands
 Rebecca Saunders (music) and Ed Atkins (text) – Us Dead Talk Love
 Jay Capperauld – Nutshell Studies of Unexplained Death
 Tom Coult – Pleasure Garden
 Cecilia McDowall – There is no rose

Opera
 Samantha Ferrando and Melanie Wilson – Current, Rising

Musical theatre
Fisherman's Friends: The Musical, with book by Amanda Whittington - ran from 13 to 30 October at the Cornwall Playhouse, Truro, starring Calum Callaghan and Susie Blake.
Get Up, Stand Up! The Bob Marley Musical, with book by Lee Hall - opened on 21 October at the Lyric Theatre, London, starring Arinzé Kene as Bob Marley.

Film scores and incidental music

Film
 Stefan Gregory – The Dig
 Dominic Lewis – Peter Rabbit 2: The Runaway, directed by Will Gluck

Television
 John Paesano   – Leonardo

British music awards
 Brit Awards – see 2021 Brit Awards

Charts and sales

Number-one singles
The singles chart includes a proportion for streaming.

Number-one albums
The albums chart includes a proportion for streaming.

Number-one compilation albums

{| class="wikitable" style="font-size:97%; text-align:center;"
|-
! Chart date(week ending) !! Album !! Chart sales !! References
|-
| 7 January || Now 107 || ||
|-
| 14 January || rowspan="4"|The Greatest Showman || ||
|-
| 21 January || ||
|-
| 28 January || ||
|-
| 4 February || ||
|-
| 11 February || Now 70s Glam Pop ||  || 
|-
| 18 February || rowspan="2"|The Greatest Showman ||  || 
|-
| 25 February || || 
|-
| 4 March ||  rowspan="2"|Now Country || || 
|-
| 11 March || || 
|- 
| 18 March || rowspan="2"| Now The 60s Girls - Then He Kissed Me || || 
|-
| 25 March || ||  
|-
| 1 April || The Greatest Showman || || 
|-
| 8 April ||  rowspan="3"|Now 108 || || 
|-
| 15 April || || 
|-
| 22 April || || 
|-
| 29 April || Now 12" 80s || || 
|-
| 6 May || Now 108 || || 
|-
| 13 May || Now Eurovision || || 
|-
| 20 May || rowspan="2"|Now 108 || || 
|-
| 27 May || || 
|-
| 3 June || 80s Rock Down || || 
|-
| 10 June || Now Live Forever - The Anthems || || 
|-
| 17 June || rowspan="3"|The Greatest Showman || || 
|-
| 24 June || || 
|-
| 1 July || || 
|-
| 8 July || Now Yearbook 1983 || ||
|-
| 15 July || The Greatest Showman || ||
|-
| 22 July || Andrew Lloyd Webber's Cinderella || ||
|-
| 29 July || Now Gold || ||
|-
| 5 August ||  rowspan="5"|Now 109 || ||
|-
| 12 August ||  ||
|-
| 19 August ||  ||
|-
| 26 August || ||
|- 
| 2 September || ||
|- 
| 9 September || Now 12" 80s Extended|| ||
|- 
| 16 September || Now 109|| ||
|- 
| 23 September || The Greatest Showman|| ||
|- 
| 30 September || Now Boogie Nights - Disco Classics|| ||
|- 
| 7 October || rowspan="2"|The Best of Bond... James Bond || ||
|-
| 14 October || ||
|-
| 21 October || rowspan="3"|The Greatest Showman || ||
|-
| 28 October || ||
|-
| 4 November || ||
|-
| 11 November || Now Yearbook 1984 || ||
|-
| 18 November || Now Rock || ||
|-
| 25 November || Dreamboats & Petticoats - Bringing On || ||
|-
| 2 December || rowspan="5"|Now 110 || 22,712 ||
|-
| 9 December || ||
|-
| 16 December || ||
|- 
| 23 December || ||
|-
| 30 December || ||
|}

Year-end charts

Top singles of the year
This chart was published by the Official Charts Company on January 4, 2022

Best-selling albums

This chart was published by the Official Charts Company on January 4, 2022

Deaths
 3 January – Gerry Marsden, singer, musician (Gerry and the Pacemakers), 78
 5 January – John Georgiadis, orchestral violinist and leader, and conductor, 81
 6 January – Osian Ellis, classical harpist, 92
 10 January – Mark Keds, singer, musician (Senseless Things), 50
 29 January – Hilton Valentine, musician, guitarist (The Animals), 77
 30 January – Sophie, Scottish musician, producer, singer-songwriter, DJ, 34
 13 February – Sydney Devine, Scottish singer, entertainer, 81
 15 February – Steuart Bedford, conductor and specialist in the music of Benjamin Britten, 81
 22 February - Tony "Feedback" Morrison, musician, (Angelic Upstarts), 61, Covid-19 
 2 March
 Chris Barber, jazz trombonist and bandleader, 90
 Anna Shuttleworth, classical cellist and pedagogue, 93
 4 March - Alan Cartwright, English bass musician, (Procol Harum), 75, stomach cancer
 20 March – Robert Gard, classical tenor resident in Australia, 90
 29 March – Elaine Hugh-Jones, classical composer, 93
 31 March
 Jane Manning, classical soprano and advocate of contemporary music, 82
 Valerie, Lady Solti, classical music philanthropist, former arts journalist, and widow of Sir Georg Solti, 83
 2 April – Simon Bainbridge, classical composer, 68
 20 April – Les McKeown, Scottish singer, (Bay City Rollers), 65.
 29 April - John Hinch, English drummer (Judas Priest), 73
 30 April – Anthony Payne, classical composer, 84
 4 May – Nick Kamen, singer, songwriter, and model, 59
 5 May – Ray Teret, disc jockey and convicted rapist, 79
 10 May – Pauline Tinsley, English opera singer, 93
 15 May – Emily Mair, Scottish-New Zealand opera singer, pianist and vocal coach, 92
 15 May – Fred Dellar, music journalist, 89
 20 May – Freddy Marks, television actor and musician (Rod, Jane and Freddy), 71
 23 June – Peter Zinovieff, engineer (EMS VCS 3) and composer, 88
 22 July – Peter Rehberg, Austrian-English electronic musician (KTL), heart attack, 53.
 3 August – Allan Stephenson, English-born South African composer, cellist, and conductor, 71.
 6 August – Les Vandyke, English singer and songwriter ("What Do You Want?", "Poor Me", "Well I Ask You"), 90.
 10 August – Stephen Wilkinson, English choral conductor and composer, 102.
 14 August – Hugh Wood, English composer, 89.
 20 August – Peter Ind, jazz double bassist and record producer, 93.
 22 August – Brian Travers, English saxophonist, (UB40), 62.
 24 August
 Fritz McIntyre, English keyboardist (Simply Red), 62.
 Charlie Watts, English drummer, (The Rolling Stones), 80.
 25 August – Dave Harper, English drummer, (Frankie & The Heartstrings).
 5 September – Sarah Harding, singer (Girls Aloud), model and actress, breast cancer, 39.
 8 September – Matthew Strachan, composer and singer-songwriter (Next Door's Baby), 50.
 9 September – Amanda Holden, musician, librettist (Bliss) and translator, 73.
 10 September – Michael Chapman, English singer-songwriter and guitarist (True North), 80.
 15 September – Norman Bailey, British-born opera singer resident in the US, 88.
 20 September
Colin Bailey, English-born jazz drummer, 87.
Julz Sale, English singer-songwriter and guitarist (Delta 5), cancer.
 21 September – Richard H. Kirk, English musician, composer, producer, (Cabaret Voltaire), 65.
 26 September – Alan Lancaster, English bassist, (Status Quo, The Party Boys), complications from multiple sclerosis, 72.
 28 September – Barry Ryan, English pop singer ("Eloise") and photographer, 72.
 30 September – Greg Gilbert, English singer, guitarist, (Delays), bowel cancer, 44.
 2 October – John Rossall, saxophonist, (The Glitter Band), cancer, 75.
 5 October – Pat Fish, musician, (The Jazz Butcher), 64.
 7 October – Rick Jones, Canadian-born television presenter (Play School, Fingerbobs) and musician (Meal Ticket), oesophageal cancer, 84.
 9 October – Jim Pembroke, English rock musician (Wigwam), 75.
 16 October – Alan Hawkshaw, composer, performer (Grange Hill), (Countdown), pneumonia, 84.
 19 October – Leslie Bricusse, English composer (Willy Wonka & the Chocolate Factory), lyricist ("Goldfinger", "You Only Live Twice") and playwright, Oscar winner (1968, 1983), 90.
 21 October – Bernard Haitink, Dutch conductor active in the UK, 92
 27 October – Gay McIntyre, Northern Irish jazz musician, 88.
 29 October – Malcolm Dome, English music journalist (Record Mirror, Kerrang!, Metal Hammer''), 66.
 31 October – Joan Carlyle, classical soprano, 90
 6 November 
 Terence "Astro" Wilson, English singer, musician, (UB40), 64.
 Andrew Barker, bassist, keyboardist, (808 State), 53.
 11 November - Graeme Edge, English drummer, musician, (The Moody Blues), 80, metastatic cancer.
 21 November – Gordon Crosse, composer, 83
30 November - Pamela Helen Stephen, classical mezzo-soprano, 57
 2 December – Richard Cole, English music manager (Led Zeppelin), 75.
 5 December – John Miles, English singer and musician ("Music"), 72.
 9 December – Steve Bronski, Scottish musician, (Bronski Beat), 61.
 10 December – Thomas "Mensi" Mensforth, English singer, (Angelic Upstarts), COVID-19, 65.
 13 December – Toby Slater, English singer, musician, (Catch (band)), 42
 17 December – John Morgan, English drummer (The Wurzels), COVID-19, 80.
 25 December – Janice Long, English radio DJ, presenter, 66.
 31 December – Graham Pauncefort, classical music recording executive and founder of the CRD label, 81

See also 
 2021 in British radio
 2021 in British television
 2021 in the United Kingdom

Notes

References 

 
2021